William Ewart Pratt (2 July 1895 – 27 May 1974) was an English cricketer. Pratt was a right-handed batsman, although his bowling style is unknown. He was born at Hinckley, Leicestershire.

Pratt made his first-class debut for Leicestershire against Warwickshire in the 1920 County Championship at Ashby Road, Hinckley. The following season he made a further six first-class appearances in the 1922 County Championship, before making two further appearances in the 1930 County Championship against Somerset and Warwickshire. In his total of nine first-class matches, Pratt scored 166 runs at an average of 10.37, with a high score of 29 not out.

He died at Leicester, Leicestershire on 27 May 1974.

References

External links
William Pratt at ESPNcricinfo
William Pratt at CricketArchive

1895 births
1974 deaths
People from Hinckley
Cricketers from Leicestershire
English cricketers
Leicestershire cricketers